Robert Paul Ashley Jr. is a retired lieutenant general in the United States Army who served as the Director of the Defense Intelligence Agency from 2017 to 2020. He previously served as Deputy Chief of Staff of the Army G-2. He received a commission through ROTC as a 1984 graduate of Appalachian State University. He retired from active duty on October 1, 2020. He currently serves as Senior Advisor to the Chairman of Arcanum, a global strategic intelligence company. He is the son of a United States Air Force veteran of the Korean War who later lived in North Carolina and worked a sewing machine mechanic.

Education
 Bachelor of Science degree in political science, Appalachian State University, Boone, North Carolina.
 Master of Science degree in strategic intelligence management, National Intelligence University, Bethesda, Maryland.
 Master of Science degree in strategic studies, US Army War College, Carlisle Barracks, Pennsylvania.

Military career

Operational deployments
 Intelligence Analyst, Allied Land Forces Southern Europe, Supreme Headquarters Allied Powers Europe, Izmir, Turkey
 Secretary to the Joint Military Commission, Stabilization Force, Operation Joint Forge, Bosnia-Herzegovina
 Commander, Office of Military Support, Washington, D.C., Operation Enduring Freedom and Operation Iraqi Freedom
 Commander, 525th Battlefield Surveillance Brigade(Airborne), XVIII Airborne Corps Operation Iraqi Freedom
 Deputy Chief of Staff, Intelligence, International Security Assistance Force and Director of Intelligence, United States Forces-Afghanistan

Dates of rank

Awards and decorations

References

Living people
United States Army soldiers
United States Army generals
Appalachian State University alumni
United States Army personnel of the War in Afghanistan (2001–2021)
United States Army personnel of the Iraq War
People of the Defense Intelligence Agency
Directors of the Defense Intelligence Agency
Directors of intelligence agencies
Military intelligence
Year of birth missing (living people)